Emmingen-Liptingen is a town in the district of Tuttlingen in Baden-Württemberg in Germany.

History
Emmingen was first mentioned in 820, Liptingen in 761.  The municipalities were combined in 1975.

Mayor
Since 1992: Joachim Löffler.

References

External links
Town website

Tuttlingen (district)
Baden